Steven Monroe (born October 30, 1972) is an American actor, stand-up comedian, and practicing psychotherapist. He has a number of television credits to his name, including guest roles on such series as 7th Heaven, CSI: Crime Scene Investigation, Criminal Minds, Charmed, Monk,
Grey's Anatomy, JAG, NYPD Blue, Veronica Mars, Zoey 101, iCarly, Supah Ninjas, Wizards of Waverly Place, and The Suite Life on Deck. He had a recurring role on Sister, Sister as Steve. His most recent role is as Scott Proctor on the CW series Crazy Ex-Girlfriend.

Monroe has appeared in a number of notable films including Austin Powers: International Man of Mystery, Cast Away, House of the Dead 2, Miss Congeniality, 100 Women and The Nutty Professor.

Personal life
Monroe was born in Tulsa, Oklahoma and is a committed Catholic.

Filmography

Film

Television

References

External links
 
 http://www.stevenmonroe.net/

1972 births
Living people
American male film actors
American male television actors
Male actors from Tulsa, Oklahoma
20th-century American male actors
21st-century American male actors
Christians from Oklahoma